Lidell Townsell is a house-music artist from Chicago, Illinois. He originally released numerous singles on the Trax and D.J. International labels. He released one album, Harmony, on Mercury/PolyGram Records as Lidell Townsell in 1992. Two singles from the album were hits in the US, "Get with U" and "Nu Nu"; the latter featured the duo M.T.F., whose members were singer Martell and emcee Silk E (no relation to Sylk-E. Fyne).

His music has influenced numerous artists including: TIGER & WOODS, Green Velvet 

In 2014 he collaborated and also sang on Shit Robot's remix of his song 'Do It (Right)'

Discography
Party People Jack Your Body (12") (TRAX, 1987)
Jack the House (TRAX, 1988)
Get The Hole  (TRAX, 1988)
Nu Nu  (Clubhouse, 1991)
Step To It  (Streetfire, 1992)
Nu Nu / Summertime Summertime (12") (with K. Pompey) (ISBA, 1992)
Harmony (with M.T.F.) (Mercury/PolyGram Records, 1992)
 Engineered & Mixed by: Jerome Mark Mikulich at the Playroom Recording Studio (Chicago Heights, IL)
All I Wanna Do (Aureus, 1997)
Girls, Girls, Girls (Music Connection, Inc., 2000)
Dance Dance (Everybody) (12") Featuring Consuela (Eclectik Recordings, 2001)	
King of the Party Records  (TRAX, 2004)
Duh Duh Da  (TRAX, 2004)
I'll Make U Dance  (Square Roots, 2004)
Lost Acid Tracks EP  (Nu Soul, 2009)
Do It (Right) Shit Robot Feat Lidell Townsell (DFA, 2014)
Get The Hole  (TRAX, 2017)
Power Bass / Step 2 It (12", W/Lbl)  (Dangerous (US), Saber Records, UKN)
Make Me Feel / Comin' Back / Nunu (12", Comp) (with Benassi Bros. / Bent) (SPG Music, UKN)

Singles

References

External links
 

Year of birth missing (living people)
Living people
Musicians from Chicago
American house musicians
Hip house musicians
Mercury Records artists